Kaunas municipality can refer to either of these two municipalities in Lithuania:

 Kaunas
 Kaunas District Municipality